Aleš Kačičnik (born 28 September 1973) is a Slovenian former professional football defender who is currently the assistant manager at Celje.

External links
Aleš Kačičnik at NZS 
Aleš Kačičnik at ÖFB 

1973 births
Living people
Slovenian footballers
Association football defenders
NK Celje players
NK Maribor players
NK Šmartno ob Paki players
NK Dravograd players
NK Domžale players
1. FC Vöcklabruck players
Slovenian PrvaLiga players
Slovenian expatriate footballers
Slovenian expatriate sportspeople in Austria
Expatriate footballers in Austria
Slovenian expatriate sportspeople in Croatia
HNK Rijeka non-playing staff
Slovenian football managers